The 36th UIT World Shooting Championships was the contemporary name of the ISSF World Shooting Championships in all ISSF shooting events that were held in Caracas, Venezuela, in 1954. It was the first time Venezuela hosted the competition (which it did again in 1982), and a new military shooting range had been constructed in the suburbs of Caracas for the event.

After their successful debut in the 1952 Summer Olympics, the Soviet Union now participated for the first time in the World Championships, and won 20 of the 30 gold medals. Rifle shooter Anatoli Bogdanov, the star of the 1952 shooting competitions in Helsinki, dominated once again with six individual and four team victories. He broke the world record in the 300 metre rifle three positions match with a margin of nine points. In the shotgun events, the United States and Italy were still on top, but the shooting greatness of especially Switzerland and the Scandinavian countries had now diminished, shifting the tide eastward.

As in most other events, the Soviet team won the team championship in 25 metre center-fire pistol. The American marksman Arthur Jackson commented that the western shooters watched with a mixed sense of pity and relief as the Soviet team shot their archaic Nagant M1895 revolvers in the pre-event training. On the match day they revealed their practical joke and instead brought brand new American Smith & Wesson match revolvers, shooting the same kind of gun and ammunition as the individual champion, and winning three points ahead of the American team.

Medal count

Rifle events

Pistol events

Shotgun events

Running target events

References 

ISSF World Shooting Championships
ISSF
S
Sport in Caracas
1954 in Venezuelan sport
20th century in Caracas
Shooting competitions in Venezuela